John Deakin (29 September 1912 – January 2001) was an English footballer who played as a centre forward in the English Football League for Bradford City.

Deakin was born in Altofts, Yorkshire.

References

1912 births
2001 deaths
People from Altofts
English footballers
Association football forwards
Bradford City A.F.C. players
English Football League players